James Pearson (24 February 1889 – 22 May 1915) was a Scotland international rugby union player. He played at Centre. At the First World War, Pearson joined the Royal Scots as a soldier; he was killed in Second Battle of Ypres.

Rugby Union career

Amateur career

Pearson was born in Dalkeith, Midlothian. He was educated at George Watson's College, where he played cricket for the Watsonians. A friend encouraged him to take up rugby as well, and he soon excelled at that as well.

Provincial career

He played for Edinburgh District against Glasgow District in the 1910 inter-city match. Edinburgh won the match 26-5.

International career

Military career

He served with the 9th Battalion, Royal Scots during the war. Following the Second Battle of Ypres, he was shot and killed by a sniper while going for water in Sanctuary Wood in May 1915.

References

External links
 "An entire team wiped out by the Great War".  The Scotsman, 6 November 2009

1889 births
1915 deaths
British Army personnel of World War I
British military personnel killed in World War I
Deaths by firearm in Belgium
Edinburgh District (rugby union) players
People educated at George Watson's College
Royal Scots soldiers
Rugby union players from Edinburgh
Scotland international rugby union players
Scottish rugby union players
Watsonians RFC players
Rugby union centres